Major General Robertus Carolus Nicolaa Remkes (born February 6, 1955) is Director, Strategy, Policy and Assessments, U.S. European Command, Stuttgart-Vaihingen, Germany. As Director of Strategy, Plans and Policy, he is responsible for formulation and staff direction of the execution of basic military and political policy, as well as planning for command activities involving relations with other U.S. Unified Commands, allied military and international military organizations and subordinate commands. He also serves as Director of Capabilities and Assessments. In this capacity he is responsible for the development of force structure requirements; conducting studies, analyses and assessments; and for evaluating military forces, plans, programs and strategies.

General Remkes received his commission upon graduation from the United States Air Force Academy in 1977 and completed pilot training at Reese AFB, Texas, in December 1978. He has served as a squadron, group and wing commander. He has flown the T-37, T-38, T-1, C-130, F-4, F-16 and the F-15. General Remkes is a graduate of the U.S. Air Force Fighter Weapons School. He is a command pilot with more than 2,700 hours of flight time.  Remkes holdes a master's degree in aviation management from Embry-Riddle Aeronautical University.

Education
1977 Bachelor of Science degree in history, United States Air Force Academy, Colorado Springs, Colorado
1984 Squadron Officer School, Maxwell AFB, Alabama
1986 Air Command and Staff College
1987 Master's degree in aviation management, Embry-Riddle Aeronautical University
1988 Armed Forces Staff College, Norfolk, Virginia
1994 Air War College, Maxwell AFB, Alabama

Assignments
January 1978 – December 1978, student, undergraduate pilot training, Reese AFB, Texas
September 1979 – May 1983, F-4 and F-16 aircraft commander and assistant flight commander, 474th Tactical Fighter Wing, Nellis AFB, Nevada
May 1983 – December 1985, F-16 instructor pilot and weapons and tactics officer, 58th Tactical Training Wing, Luke AFB, Arizona
January 1986 – January 1988, aide to the Commander, Tactical Air Command, Langley AFB, Virginia
January 1988 – November 1988, student, Armed Forces Staff College, Norfolk, Virginia
November 1988 – November 1989, flight commander and Chief, Wing Weapons and Tactics Division, 8th Tactical Fighter Wing, Kunsan Air Base, Korea
November 1989 – July 1990, Chief of Weapons and Tactics, Directorate of Tactics and Test, 57th Fighter Wing, Nellis AFB, Nevada
July 1990 – July 1991, Chief of Safety, 57th Fighter Wing, Nellis AFB, Nevada
July 1991 – October 1991, Commander, 4443rd Tactical Training Squadron (Air Warrior), Nellis AFB, Nevada
November 1991 – July 1992, Commander, 57th Operations Support Squadron, Nellis AFB, Nevada
August 1992 – July 1993, Commander, Officer Training School, Lackland AFB, Texas
July 1993 – June 1994, student, Air War College, Maxwell AFB, Alabama
June 1994 – May 1996, staff analyst, Office of the Director of Programs, Analysis and Evaluation, Office of the Secretary of Defense, the Pentagon, Washington, D.C.
June 1996 – June 1998, Commander, 47th Operations Group, Laughlin AFB, Texas
June 1998 – June 2000, Commander, 39th Wing and 39th Air and Space Expeditionary Wing, Incirlik Air Base, Turkey
July 2000 – August 2001, deputy director of plans and programs, Headquarters Air Combat Command, Langley AFB, Virginia
August 2001 – December 2001, director of plans and programs, Headquarters ACC, Langley AFB, Virginia
December 2001 – March 2002, deputy director of plans and programs, Headquarters ACC, Langley AFB, Virginia
April 2002 – February 2004, Commander, 3rd Wing, Elmendorf AFB, Alaska
February 2004 - July 2006, Commander, Air Force Recruiting Service, Headquarters Air Education and Training Command, Randolph AFB, Texas
July 2006 - June 2008, Director, Strategy, Policy and Assessments, U.S. European Command, Stuttgart-Vaihingen, Germany
July 2008 - present, Director, Air Component Coordination Element, Air Forces Central Command, Kabul, Afghanistan

Flight information
Rating: Command pilot
Flight hours: More than 2,700
Aircraft flown: Cessna T-37, T-38 Talon, T-1A Jayhawk, C-130 Hercules, F-4 Phantom II, F-16A/B/C/D and F-15C/D

Major awards and decorations
  Legion of Merit with two oak leaf clusters
  Defense Meritorious Service Medal
  Meritorious Service Medal with four oak leaf clusters
  Air Medal with two oak leaf clusters
  Air Force Commendation Medal with oak leaf cluster
  Air Force Achievement Medal
  Joint Meritorious Unit Award
  Air Force Outstanding Unit Award
  Air Force Organizational Excellence Award

Effective dates of promotion
Second Lieutenant June 1, 1977
First Lieutenant June 1, 1979
Captain June 1, 1981
Major March 1, 1988
Lieutenant Colonel July 1, 1991
Colonel September 1, 1996
Brigadier General June 1, 2003
Major General September 2, 2006

References

United States Air Force generals
United States Air Force Academy alumni
Recipients of the Legion of Merit
Living people
Embry–Riddle Aeronautical University alumni
Recipients of the Air Medal
1955 births